Wyndham College is a public senior secondary school located at Nirimba Fields, New South Wales, Australia.

Established in 1999, its intake of students comes from three surrounding high schools: Quakers Hill High School, Riverstone High School, and Seven Hills High School. They with Wyndham College, make the Nirimba Collegiate Group of Schools. The Collegiate Group of Schools all operate independently of each other, but the four principals work closely together.
  
The college is situated on the Nirimba Education Precinct, co-located within: the University of Western Sydney, Blacktown, Western Sydney Institute of TAFE - Nirimba College, and St John Paul II Catholic College, Senior Campus. The college has many native gardens that have won many awards; the college itself, however, is set in a bushland environment.

Visual artworks completed by students from the college are regularly nominated and featured in Art Express.

History
Wyndham College was named after the previous NSW Director General of Education, Harold Wyndham, who was visionary in implementing the HSC for Year 12 students and the School Certificate for Year 10 students. Wyndham College is built on the former site of the naval training base , and the campus derives its name "Nirimba Education Precinct" from this historical connection.

School crest
Wyndham College's crest was designed by the school's founding principal, Ian Wing, in 1998. The crest features Wyndham's motto of "Working Together to Widen Horizons", with a representation of a book. Traditionally the book is associated with learning and the motto refers to the broad curriculum that the students have access to through the school's links with the precinct partners - TAFE, Western Sydney University and St John Paul II Catholic College.

Admissions and enrolment
Students who attend the Collegiate Year 7-10 schools of Riverstone High School, Quakers Hill High School, and Seven Hills High School have an automatic right of entry into Wyndham College for their senior years of schooling. As such, the College serves a large and diverse community from established areas in Seven Hills and Kings Langley, newly developed urban areas in Quakers Hill, Acacia Gardens, Stanhope Gardens, Rouse Hill and Schofields to the more semi-rural communities of Riverstone and Marsden Park. Outside of the collegiate schools, acceptance to Wyndham College is highly competitive with many students applying for limited enrolment positions each year. The school's enrolment committee conducts interviews with prospective students and their parents/guardians when making their decisions about entry for applicants.

Curriculum
A large number of high school students means that nearly the full range of HSC subjects, as well as a number of other courses designed to meet students' special needs and interests are provided. Wyndham College is registered and accredited with the New South Wales Board of Studies and follows the mandated curriculum for Years 11 and 12. Over 58 courses are offered onsite to Year 12 students alone including Board developed or endorsed courses, life skills courses and 6 industry curriculum frameworks in the areas of Hospitality; Retail; Business Services; Construction; Information Technology; and Engineering/Metal. The College timetable is structured to allow students to access TAFE-delivered VET courses and University subjects without interrupting other studies. With this flexibility, students can complete the HSC year with multiple accreditations. One free line is also incorporated into student timetables to allow for group study work and access to teaching staff for individual consultation.

Sports
Rugby league, Indoor Soccer, Ultimate Frisbee, Swimming, Athletics, Golf, Cross Country Netball

Notable alumni

Sport
 Andrew Beato – Open Water Swimming, World Open Water Championships
Andrew Fifita – Rugby League Player, Wests Tigers
Kenrick Monk – Swimming, 2008 Olympics, 2007 World Aquatics Championships, 2010 Commonwealth Games
Arts
Kain O'Keeffe – actor

See also 
 List of Government schools in New South Wales

References

External links 
 Wyndham College website

Educational institutions established in 1999
Public high schools in Sydney
1999 establishments in Australia